IVF or in vitro fertilization is an assisted reproductive technology that involves fertilisation of an egg outside of the human body.

IVF may also refer to:
Integrated Vehicle Fluids, a technique/system to extend the in orbit life of the ULA Advanced Cryogenic Evolved Stage (rocket).
Inter-Varsity Fellowship or Universities and Colleges Christian Fellowship
Intervertebral foramen
 Intravenous fluids (IV fluids) as intravenous therapy
.ivf, the file extension for Indeo video files